The GeeksPhone Keon is an entry-level smartphone released by GeeksPhone in April 2013. It is intended for software developers wanting to build and test mobile applications on the new Firefox OS, not for general consumers.

The Keon and the higher-end Peak are the first commercially available mobile devices running Firefox OS.

History and availability
GeeksPhone Keon and Peak initially became available on 23 April 2013 and the first batch sold out in a few hours.

See also
Comparison of Firefox OS devices

References

Firefox OS devices
Linux-based devices
Mobile Linux
Open-source mobile phones
Smartphones